Wiluna is a small town in the Goldfields-Esperance region (since 2021) of Western Australia. It is situated on the edge of the Western Desert at the gateway to the Canning Stock Route and Gunbarrel Highway. It is the service centre of the local area for the local Martu people, the pastoral industry, the Wiluna Gold Mine, and many more people who work on other mines in the area on a "fly-in/fly-out" basis. Mean maximum temperatures range from 19 °C (66 °F) in July, to 38 °C (100 °F) in January.

The closest service centre is in Meekatharra.

Overview 
Wiluna has from 200 to 600 Aboriginal people living within its community, depending upon the nature, time and place of the traditional law ceremonies across the Central Desert region. The traditional Aboriginal owners (a grouping known as the Martu) were "settled" as a consequence of the British colonisation process that began in the 1800s. In the 1950s a church-based group were supported by the government of the day to establish a mission. The traditional people lost their lands through many different processes, including the issuing of pastoral leases, the discovery of gold and the influx of non-Aboriginal people onto their lands.

Before and after the atomic nuclear testing near Maralinga in the 1950s, many Aboriginal people from at least three different tribal and language groups were forced to live within the mission site. This created many conflicts and the legacy continues today. Much traditional knowledge and skill exists today amongst the Aboriginal residents and visitors.

The existence of a local pub has created much conflict with many people opposed to its presence arising from the conflict and trauma associated with alcohol abuse. The town also has a general store, petrol, caravan park, sports oval, school, and health clinic.

Local water holes are much damaged and overused after years of cattle use.

During the wet season, large lakes may form that attract an array of wildlife. The region has snakes, kangaroos, bungarras (large lizard/goanna), bush turkeys, donkeys, horses, camels and dingoes.

Willuna is home to VMW, a marine weather transmitter operated by the Bureau of Meteorology.

Parts of the unsealed and flood-prone road between Wiluna and Meekatharra are  being sealed, as part of a pilot program in which the Government of Western Australia provided  for road work contractors in collaboration with the Martu-ku Yiwarra Training Centre.

Mines

The Wiluna area was explored by Lawrence Wells in 1892.  Gold was discovered in the area in 1896, and within a few months over 300 prospectors were in the area. The town of Wiluna was gazetted in 1898, the name Wiluna being the Wati (Aboriginal language) name for the area. By the 1930s, the town had a population of over 9,000 people, but World War II severely affected the gold mining industry, and many mines were shut down. By 1963 the population had fallen to less than 100. Gold mining resumed in the area in 1981.

The mine was shut down by its new owner, Apex Minerals, in August 2007 for refurbishment and resource definition.

As of January 2015 it was being placed into care and maintenance due to low global prices for lead.

Wiluna and the Mid-West region are the site of Western Australia's most advanced uranium mining projects. Three projects are in the approval process, the Lake Maitland uranium project, the Lake Way uranium project, and the Yeelirrie uranium project which BHP Billiton sold to Canadian uranium company Cameco. All three are located within  of Wiluna.
All three mines are opposed by environmental groups and some local people. Yeelirrie is most fiercely opposed, with over 40 years of clear opposition from traditional owners.

Meteors
In October 1960, two station workers named Fred Vincenti and Frank Quadrio were opening a fence gate on the Millbillillie-Jundee track  from Wiluna when they witnessed a bright fireball falling into spinifex (Triodia) grassland to the north. The debris from this meteor became known as the Millbillillie meteorite and is understood to be pieces of the asteroid Vesta that had at some point been knocked off by a collision in the asteroid belt. Although no official specimens were recovered until 1970 it is understood that members of the local Aboriginal community had collected pieces.

Another meteorite fall was recorded near Wiluna on 2 September 1967. This meteorite was a H5-class object; specimens were collected and housed in the Western Australian Museum.

Education 
Wiluna Remote Community School is a school that provides education for students from year 1–12, currently having a student population of between 85 and 115 students.

The school provides a bus as transport to and from the school for the students. The indigenous language of the area is Martu Wangka dialect, however most students speak Aboriginal English.

Origin of name
An early mining settlement of Lake Way Gold, named after the dry Lake Way south of Wiluna, established around 1896, was called Weeloona, derived from an Aboriginal word meaning Place of wind or Windy place. However, the name is also sometimes claimed to come from the cry of the curlew, which is frequent in the area.

Geography

Climate
Wiluna experiences a desert climate (Köppen climate classification BWh), though like most of inland Western Australia it has seen its rainfall increase by around 40 percent since 1967. The heaviest rainfall, however, was associated with the April 1900 floods when the town received , two-and-half-times its normal annual rainfall.

Railways 
Wiluna was the furthest away from Perth that the narrow gauge Western Australian Government Railways system reached. The Wiluna branch was connected to the main Northern Railway at Meekatharra. The branch opened to Wiluna on 2 November 1932. The line was closed on 5 August 1957.

People from Wiluna 
The Indigenous people who have always lived in the region come from different tribal groups. Accomplished hunters, crafts people, pastoralists, bush mechanics and people with many other skills exist today within the community.

The former Governor-General of Australia, Major General Michael Jeffery was born in Wiluna on 12 December 1937. A new primary school was constructed in Wiluna after Jeffery visited the town in 2006 and criticised the condition of the existing school.

Warri and Yatungka were a famous Aboriginal couple who died in Wiluna in 1979. They were the last of the Mandildjara people to leave their country and the hunter-gatherer lifestyle. Their Romeo and Juliet-like story was recorded in the best-selling book The Last of the Nomads by Dr W J Peasley. This story is recounted as Peasley, organising the expedition, although it was Stan Gratte of Geraldton (OAM) who organised this party to recover them when urged by Warri's brother Moodjeren, who was concerned, due to old age and the lack of young people who would normally assist the elderly, they would not survive the extended drought which was now gripping Central Australia. Emaciated and likely close to death, the couple were brought to Wiluna where they were forgiven by their people for breaking the Mandildjara marriage laws decades before. They died in 1979 within four weeks of each other.

See also 
 Wiluna Airport

Notes

Citations

Sources

Further reading
 Garrick Moore: Mining Towns of Western Australia, published: 1996
 Phil R. Heydon: Wiluna: Edge of the Desert, published: 1996, publisher: Hesperian Press
 White F. Miner with a Heart of Gold: biography of a mineral science and engineering educator. Friesen Press, Victoria. 2020. ISBN 978-1-5255-7765-9 (Hardcover) 978-1-5255-7766-6 (Paperback) 978-1-5255-7767-3 (eBook)

External links 

 Shire of Wiluna homepage

 
Mining towns in Western Australia
Towns in Western Australia
Canning Stock Route